The Tanzania Democratic Alliance (TADEA) is a political party in Tanzania. The party was registered on 28 August 1992. It is currently being presided by John D. Lifa Chipaka.

Political parties in Tanzania
Political parties established in 1992
1993 establishments in Tanzania